Espelundens Idrætsanlæg is an association football facility in Rødovre, Denmark. It is the home stadium of 2nd Division club Boldklubben Avarta and lower league side Islev Boldklub, who have their club house 100 m north of the stadium. The facility consists of the stadium, which has a capacity of 6,000 of which 460 are seated, the ground also includes a cafeteria, seven additional grass pitches, three gravel pitches, six mini pitches and a roller hockey rink. In January 2020 it was renamed Tømrermester Jim Jensens Park, after the naming rights were acquired by carpenter Jim Jensen, who renamed the stadium after himself.

The additional grass pitches are used as reserve grounds for GIF Orient Fodbold.

Panorama

References

 

Football venues in Denmark
Buildings and structures in Rødovre Municipality